The 1953 Icelandic Basketball Tournament was the 2nd season of the top tier men's basketball league in Iceland. The season started on April 12, 1953 and ended on April 16, 1953. ÍKF won its 2nd title by posting the best record in the league.

Competition format
The participating teams played each other once for a total of 3 games. The top team won the national championship.

Regular season

References

External links
Official Icelandic Basketball Federation website

Lea
Úrvalsdeild karla (basketball)